Dome Valley is a rural area in the northern Auckland Region of New Zealand. It is situated between the towns of Warkworth and Wellsford.  and the Left Branch of the Mahurangi River run through the valley.

Demographics
Dome Valley is covered by two SA1 statistical areas, which cover . Dome Valley is part of the larger Dome Valley-Matakana statistical area.

Dome Valley had a population of 249 at the 2018 New Zealand census, a decrease of 12 people (−4.6%) since the 2013 census, and an increase of 24 people (10.7%) since the 2006 census. There were 75 households, comprising 126 males and 126 females, giving a sex ratio of 1.0 males per female, with 48 people (19.3%) aged under 15 years, 30 (12.0%) aged 15 to 29, 120 (48.2%) aged 30 to 64, and 45 (18.1%) aged 65 or older.

Ethnicities were 86.7% European/Pākehā, 10.8% Māori, 1.2% Pacific peoples, 8.4% Asian, and 2.4% other ethnicities. People may identify with more than one ethnicity.

Although some people chose not to answer the census's question about religious affiliation, 68.7% had no religion, 24.1% were Christian and 1.2% were Muslim.

Of those at least 15 years old, 45 (22.4%) people had a bachelor's or higher degree, and 33 (16.4%) people had no formal qualifications. 30 people (14.9%) earned over $70,000 compared to 17.2% nationally. The employment status of those at least 15 was that 96 (47.8%) people were employed full-time, 36 (17.9%) were part-time, and 9 (4.5%) were unemployed.

Landfill controversy 
A controversial proposal to build a landfill in the area caused protests and demonstrations from environmental groups in Auckland in the early 2020s. It was approved despite stiff opposition, and Waste Management New Zealand would construct and operate 60 hectares of landfill after given consent to do so.

It was controversial because it would have an ecological impact on the area; it would contaminate local waterways, such as the Kaipara Harbour's water catchment. Waste Management New Zealand further had an application for a plan change to use 1000 hectares of land in the Dome Valley site recognized as a "landfill precinct". 

The plan change was further declined by Auckland Council.

Attractions 
Attractions in Dome Valley include Sheepworld, a premier showcase for sheep and wool production, Dome Forest Walkway, a walkway going through the Dome Forest and Dome Valley Gun Club.

References

External links 
Sheepworld
Waste Management New Zealand
Dome Valley Gun Club

Rodney Local Board Area
Populated places in the Auckland Region